Knockadalteen is a townland in County Roscommon in Ireland.  It is bounded on the north by the parish of Tumna, on the east by the townland of Mullaghmore, on the south by Scregg, and on the west by Knockananima and Toulagh. 

Townlands of County Roscommon